

References

1987
Soviet
Films